Shorea flemmichii is a species of plant in the family Dipterocarpaceae. It is endemic to Borneo. S. flemmichii is threatened by habitat loss due to human population expansion.

References

flemmichii
Endemic flora of Borneo
Trees of Borneo
Taxonomy articles created by Polbot

Vulnerable flora of Asia